Permanganometry is one of the techniques used in chemical quantitative analysis. It is a redox titration that involves the use of permanganates to measure the amount of analyte present in unknown chemical samples. It involves two steps, namely the titration of the analyte with potassium permanganate solution and then the standardization of potassium permanganate solution with standard sodium oxalate solution. The titration involves volumetric manipulations to prepare the analyte solutions.

Permanganometry allows the detection and estimation of the quantitative presence of various chemical species, such as iron(II), manganese(II), oxalate, nitrite, and hydrogen peroxide.

Reaction 
Depending on the conditions in which the titration is performed, the manganese is reduced from an oxidation of +7 to +2, +4, or +6.

In most cases, permanganometry is performed in a very acidic solution in which the following electrochemical reaction occurs:

 + 8 H+ + 5 e− →  Mn2+ + 4 H2O;  E° = +1.51 V

which shows that KMnO4 (in an acidic medium) is a very strong oxidizing agent, able to oxidize Fe2+ (E°Fe3+/Fe2+ = +0.77 V), Sn2+ (E°Sn4+/Sn2+ = +0.2 V), and even Cl− (E°Cl2/Cl− = +1.36 V).

In weak acidic medium  can not accept 5 electrons to form Mn2+. Instead, it accepts only 3 electrons and forms solid MnO2 by the following reaction:

 + 4 H+ + 3 e− → MnO2 + 2 H2O; E° = +1.69 V

In a strongly basic solution, with the concentration c(NaOH) >1 mol dm−3, only one electron is accepted to produce manganate:

 + e− → ; E° = +0.56 V

References

Analytical chemistry
Titration